Do Tappeh-ye Olya (also Romanized as Do Tappeh-ye ‘Olyā and Do Tappeh ‘Olyā; also known as Do Tappeh-ye Bālā, Do Tappeh Bālā, Dow Tappeh Bālā, and Pina duz) is a village in Howmeh Rural District, in the Dovtapa District of Khodabandeh County, Zanjan Province, Iran. At the 2006 census, its population was 302, in 54 families.

References 

Populated places in Khodabandeh County